Southwestern Illinois College is a public community college in Illinois with campuses in Belleville, Granite City, and Red Bud. It also has off-campus sites throughout the district, including Scott Air Force Base and the East St. Louis Community College Center.

History 
The college was founded in 1946 as Belleville Junior College, operating under the jurisdiction of Belleville Township High School District 201. More than 60 percent of the 169 students enrolled for its first semester were World War II veterans who had just returned from service.

In 1965, the Illinois General Assembly passed the Illinois Junior College Act, which created community college districts throughout the state. The following year, area residents voted to establish the Class I Belleville Junior College District 522. Belleville Junior College became Belleville Area College July 1, 1967.

Construction of the Belleville Campus on Carlyle Avenue was completed in 1971. In 1983, the college opened the Granite City Center, followed by the Red Bud Center two years later. Both sites received approval for campus status from the Illinois Community College Board in July 1985. In 1999, a vote to change the name of Belleville Area College was passed. On January 1, 2000, the college name changed to Southwestern Illinois College.

Campuses 

The college has three campuses, on Carlyle Avenue in Belleville, in Granite City and in Red Bud.

Academics 
The college offers associate degrees and certificates. SWIC also serves the community through Community Education, Programs and Services for Older Persons (PSOP), and Selsius™  Corporate and Career Training.

From 2020 through at least 2022, SWIC has offered one-year long special vocational training in East St. Louis, Illinois using state grants varying in size from $1.2 to $1.4 million.  Local residents (in a city with a 97.4% African-American population) are offered training in Welding, Nurse Assistant, Food Service, Forklift Training, and Heating, Ventilation, Air Conditioning and Refrigeration, Phlebotomy, Practical Nursing. Since 2019, 130 students have received credentials in this program.

As of December 6, 2021, SWIC is accredited by the Higher Learning Commission.

Student life 
There are no dorms on campus. Southwestern Illinois College has many clubs on all three campuses, including College Democrats and Phi Theta Kappa, as well as other college activities.

Every year the students elect someone to represent them on the Board of Trustees of Southwestern Illinois College.

Sports 
College athletics teams are called the Blue Storm.

Arts 
The William and Florence Schmidt Art Center is located on the Belleville campus of the college.

Notable people

Alumni
Lawrence Blackledge – Professional basketball player
Justin Hampson – New York Mets player
Josh Harrellson – Professional basketball player
Matt Hughes – retired mixed martial artist, former Ultimate Fighting Championship Welterweight Champion, UFC Hall of Fame member
Sandra Magnus – NASA astronaut
Zeke Moore (basketball) – Professional basketball player
Scott E. Penny - police chief and politician
Randy Wells – Chicago Cubs/Texas Rangers player

Faculty
Otis L. Miller, Jr. – professor and politician
Scott E. Penny - police chief and politician
Van Allen Plexico – author

See also 
 List of community colleges in Illinois

References

External links 

 
Belleville, Illinois
Buildings and structures in St. Clair County, Illinois
Community colleges in Illinois
Education in Randolph County, Illinois
Education in St. Clair County, Illinois
Education in the Metro East
Educational institutions established in 1946
Granite City, Illinois
Universities and colleges in Madison County, Illinois
1946 establishments in Illinois
NJCAA athletics